Pouye (Bouye) is a language spoken in Sandaun Province, Papua New Guinea, by a thousand people, and growing. It is spoken in the seven villages of Bulawa, Kiliauto, Komtin, Maurom, Wokien, Wulme, and Yukilau, which are mostly located within East Wapei Rural LLG.

A grammar of the Pouye language is published here:
https://www.sil.org/resources/archives/62023

References

Languages of Sandaun Province
Ram languages